2017 Rugby League World Cup Group D was one of four groups in the 2017 Rugby League World Cup. The group comprised Fiji, United States and Italy. Fiji topped the group and therefore qualified for the 2017 Rugby League World Cup knockout stage.

Overall

Fixtures

Fiji v United States

Ireland vs Italy (Inter-Group)

Italy v United States

Fiji vs Wales (Inter-Group)

Fiji v Italy

Papua New Guinea v United States (Inter-Group)

References

2017 Rugby League World Cup